Hydrocinnamaldehyde is the organic compound with the formula C6H5CH2CH2CHO.  It is produced by the hydrogenation of cinnamaldehyde. The compound is used in many mechanistic studies. It is a common substrate in organic synthesis.

References

Phenylpropanoids